Alistipes ihumii is a Gram-negative, non-spore-forming, anaerobic and non-motile bacterium from the genus of Alistipes which has been isolated from human feces.

References

Bacteria described in 2017
Bacteroidia